Rebecca Hains is a communication and media studies scholar and author. Hains is a frequently quoted expert on the subject of children's media culture and marketing, which she studies from a feminist media studies and critical/cultural studies perspective. She is a professor in the Media and Communication Department at Salem State University in Salem, Massachusetts, where she has also served as department chair and a faculty fellow in diversity, equity and inclusion.

Publications
Hains' 2012 book Growing Up With Girl Power: Girlhood On Screen and in Everyday Life presented a critical history of the girl power phenomenon. Combining textual analysis with field work among children and interviews with young women, the book considers girls' interpretations of girl power's messages about female empowerment, girlhood, strength, femininity, and race. In the book, Hains detailed strengths and limitations in commercialized girl power's handling of preadolescent body image, gender identity, sexism, and racism.

Her 2014 book The Princess Problem: Guiding Our Girls through the Princess-Obsessed Years critiqued princess culture's consumerism and its gender, race, and beauty stereotypes, with special attention to the Disney Princess franchise. The book combines original field research and secondary analysis of scholarly research on media and child development, interpreting these studies for a mainstream audience of parents. It focuses on helping children develop critical thinking and critical viewing skills and was the subject of significant media attention, including a double segment on the Meredith Vieira Show.

Hains has also edited, with collaborators, three anthologies on children's culture: Princess Cultures: Mediating Girls’ Imaginations and Identities,  Cultural Studies of LEGO: More Than Just Bricks , and The Marketing of Children’s Toys: Critical Perspectives on Children’s Consumer Culture.

Media appearances and perspective
Conventional U.S. and international media frequently cite Hains as an academic expert on children's media culture. Her critical perspective on media representation of girls and women, as well as gender stereotypes on screen and in children's toys, have been reported on in major publications, news programs, and radio broadcasts.

For example, her analyses of Barbie have been covered by Adweek, the New York Times, and on SiriusXM, while her critiques of Disney Princess and princess culture have been reported on by the BBC, The Christian Science Monitor, Fortune, the Guardian, the Meredith Vieira Show, the New York Times, NPR's On Point, and The Wall Street Journal

More broadly, many outlets reporting on gender-neutral toys and gendered toy marketing have included her expert commentary, such as CBC Radio's The Current, Fox and Friends, NPR's Morning Edition, Slate, and the Wall Street Journal. Hains also spoke extensively about her expertise in princess culture, girl power, and the history of girls and media in the ARTE FRANCE documentary Pink Attitude: Princesses, Pop Stars and Girl Power.

Academia
Hains' academic credits include numerous peer-reviewed journal articles, including "Power feminism, mediated: Girl power and the commercial politics of change," published in Women's Studies in Communication. Her most frequently cited article, it often informs scholars' research about feminism and power dynamics in the media. Hains was invited as a special guest to the White House Council on Women and Girls's Research Conference on Girls in 2014

Hains is on the National Advisory Council of Media Literacy Now. and the editorial board of the Journal of Children and Media. She was previously a board member of the Brave Girls Alliance, the International Communication Association, and the National Women' Studies Association

Education
Hains holds a B.A. from Emmanuel College, an M.S. from Boston University, and a Ph.D. from Temple University

References 

Year of birth missing (living people)
Living people
American mass media scholars
American media critics
Salem State University faculty
Emmanuel College (Massachusetts) alumni
Boston University alumni
Temple University alumni
American women non-fiction writers
American feminist writers
Feminist studies scholars
North American cultural studies
American academics
Academics from Massachusetts
Women scholars and academics
American women critics